Bhutan: A Visual Odyssey Across the Last Himalayan Kingdom is a gigantic 2003 book composed of photographs taken on four trips through Bhutan. The book was created by scientist Michael Hawley along with photographers Carolyn Bess, Sandy Choi, Dorji Drukpa, Becky Hurwitz, Choki Lhamo Kaka, Gyelsey Loday, Christopher Newell, David Salesin, and Ming Zhang. It was edited by Christopher Newell and published by Friendly Planet in December 2003.

The book was certified by Guinness World Records as the largest book in the world until 2007. The 118 page tome weighs approximately 133 pounds (60.3 kg) and measures five feet by seven feet (2.13 × 1.53 m) when opened. It costs $2000 to produce and sells for $10,000, which is donated to Friendly Planet, a charity that builds schools in Cambodia and Bhutan.

The University of Washington, University of Texas at El Paso, Miami University of Ohio, and the Wichita Public Library all have copies in their Special Collections. As part of the Dalai Lama's visit to Miami University, Geshe Kalsang Damdul and Geshe Jampel Kakpa, of Dharamshala, India, turned two pages of the book as honorary guests.

A smaller edition of the book was published in November 2004. The miniature version of 216 pages is 17.2 x . This edition weighs 6.8 pounds and sells for $100.

References 

2003 non-fiction books
American travel books
Books of photographs
Photographic collections and books
Books about Bhutan